Eriogonum incanum is a species of wild buckwheat known by the common name frosted buckwheat. It is native to the Sierra Nevada of California and extreme western Nevada. It is also known from Oregon.

Description
This is a dioecious perennial herb which forms mats up to 20 centimeters tall and 30 wide, sometimes quite a bit smaller. It has clusters of woolly, petioled leaves one to two centimeters long that form a gray-green or yellowish layer on the sandy soil or among rocks.

The plant bears dense, rounded clusters of flowers, sometimes on erect stalks, that are yellow, red, or both. Male plants produce staminate flowers 2 or 3 millimeters wide, and female plants produce slightly larger pistillate flowers.

References

External links
Eriogonum incanum - Photo gallery

incanum
Flora of California
Flora of Nevada
Flora of the Sierra Nevada (United States)
Dioecious plants
Flora without expected TNC conservation status